Interavia Airlines (Russian: Авиакомпания Интеравиа) was an airline based in Moscow, Russia. It operated scheduled and charter passenger services. Its main base was Domodedovo International Airport, Moscow. The Russian aviation authority suspended their flights from 17 October 2008.

History
The airline was established as Astair Airlines in 1998 and became Interavia Airlines on 18 May 2005. It started regular services from Moscow in July 2005. Interavia Airlines was registered as a corporation with publicly traded stock, with no shares owned by the Russian Government.

Because of financial difficulties, the airline suspended operations on October 9, 2008 and shortly thereafter lost its operating licence. Astair only flew with a few (or one) Yakovlev Yak-42.

Destinations
As at October 2008, Interavia Airlines operated flights to:

Russia
Adler/Sochi (Sochi International Airport)
Anapa (Anapa Airport)
Arkhangelsk (Talagi Airport)
Blagoveshchensk (Ignatyevo Airport)
Irkutsk (Irkutsk Airport)
Magadan (Sokol Airport)
Makhachkala (Uytash Airport)
Mineralnye Vody (Mineralnye Vody Airport)
Moscow (Domodedovo Airport)

Fleet

The Interavia Airlines fleet included the following aircraft (as of 6 October 2008):

The corporation planned to buy several Italian ATR-42 40-50-seat turboprops and some Boeing aircraft.

References

External links

Interavia Airlines

Defunct airlines of Russia
Companies based in Moscow
Airlines established in 1998
Airlines disestablished in 2008